The Chairman of the Provisional Government of the Irish Free State was a transitional post established in January 1922, lasting until the creation of the Irish Free State in December 1922.

The Anglo-Irish Treaty of December 1921 was passed by the Irish Republic's Dáil Éireann.  The British government also required it to be passed by the House of Commons of Southern Ireland, and for a legal government to be established.   Michael Collins became Chairman of the Provisional Government (i.e. prime minister). He also remained Minister for Finance of Arthur Griffith's republican administration.

After Collins and Griffith's deaths in August 1922, W. T. Cosgrave became both Chairman of the Provisional Government and President of Dáil Éireann, and the distinction between the two became increasingly confused and irrelevant until the creation of the Irish Free State in December 1922.

Office holders

See also
Irish heads of government since 1919
Provisional Government of the Irish Free State